The Auschwitz cross is a cross erected near the Auschwitz concentration camp, in Oświęcim County, Poland, which was erected to commemorate the 74,000 Polish Catholics who died at the concentration camp as a consequence of the Nazi German occupation of Poland during the Second World War. This included two canonised Catholic saints: St. Maximilian Maria Kolbe and St. Teresa Benedicta of the Cross. Carmelite nuns opened a convent near Auschwitz I in 1984.

Prominent Jewish organisations attempted to pressure Poland to remove the cross commemorating the Polish victims. Edgar Bronfman, president of the World Jewish Congress called for the removal of the convent. Public statements from Theo Klein, president of the Council of Jews in France, Jewish activist Serge Klarsfeld, and Gerhard Riegner, representative of the World Jewish Congress, also demanded the removal of the convent. The American branch of the World Jewish Congress also protested with statements from chairman Wolfe Kelman and the Orthodox faction representative Zvi Zakheim. Representatives of the Catholic Church agreed in 1987. One year later the Carmelites erected the large cross to commemorate Pope John Paul II's 1979 Mass for some 500,000 people on the grounds of the Auschwitz II (Birkenau) extermination camp. This mass took place just outside Block 11, a torture prison in Auschwitz I, visible from within the camp. The Carmelites remained in their convent until 1993 and moved then to a new convent nearby; their cross was not removed.

Jewish opposition
Tensions escalated into 1989 when two notable protests occurred. In May 1989, the Women's International Zionist Organization led a protest of 300 members carrying signs and Israeli flags. In July 1989, New York City Rabbi Avraham Weiss traveled with six supporters and led a protest that earned international notoriety.  Weiss and his supporters scaled the fence of the convent wearing concentration camp uniforms. The group then harassed the nuns with banging and shouting until local Polish workers ran them off with buckets of water. Representatives of the Council of Jews and the World Jewish Congress stated that mostly Jews were killed at Auschwitz and demanded that religious symbols be kept away from the site. Ian Kagedan of B'nai Brith Canada called the erection of the cross, "an obvious gap in understanding."

The central issue in the controversy over the Auschwitz cross was articulated by the author and former Catholic priest James Carroll:

In March 1998 the Plenipotentiary for Relations with the Jewish Diaspora, was quoted in a French newspaper as saying that the cross would be removed, because its presence was disrespectful of the Jewish legacy at Auschwitz. By the end of March 1998, a large group of government and nongovernment leaders, including then Chief of the Prime Minister's Cabinet , 130 Sejm deputies, 16 senators, former President Lech Wałęsa, Cardinal Józef Glemp, and Gdańsk Archbishop Tadeusz Rakoczy, went on record as opposing the removal of the cross. The cross is clearly visible from the former camp's Block 11 and marks the site where Polish political prisoners (including Catholic priests) and later Jewish prisoners were murdered by the Germans.  The leader of the Defenders of the Pope's Cross, and Mieczysław Janosz, leader of the Association of War Victims, which leased the land on which the cross stood, distributed leaflets opposing the removal of the cross. Kazimierz Świtoń died in 2014.

New crosses
In August 1998, the erection of some hundreds of additional smaller crosses outside Auschwitz, despite the opposition of the country's bishops, sparked intense controversy in the Polish Catholic and international Jewish community. Government efforts to resolve the situation in the fall of 1998 through the courts by revoking the lease on the land held by the Association of War Victims was met with little success. The government wanted the local courts to agree to appoint an administrator for the former convent site pending a legal decision on the validity of the lease revocation. In October 1998, the local court refused the request to appoint such an administrator, a decision upheld in December 1998 by an appeals court in Bielsko-Biała, which returned the lease issue to the local court. At the end of 1998, complicated legal maneuverings continued, and two separate cases were before the local court—the government's effort to break the lease and the tenants' effort to have the government action ruled illegal.

In May 1999, the Parliament passed a government-sponsored law to protect the sites of all the former camps in the country. The government consulted with international Jewish groups in preparing the law, which gave the government the power it needed to resolve the issue of the "new crosses".

In late May 1999, Świtoń announced that he had laid explosives under the site where the crosses were erected, and that he would detonate them if the government attempted to remove him or the crosses. Police officers quickly arrested Świtoń for possessing explosives and making public threats. After Świtoń's arrest, local authorities removed the crosses to a nearby Franciscan monastery, under the supervision of the local bishop, and sealed off the site to prevent the erection of additional crosses. The large cross is not to be removed from the site for the time being.

See also 
 Cross in front of Presidential Palace in Warsaw

References

Further reading

External links 
 Voices on Antisemitism Interview with James Carroll from the United States Holocaust Memorial Museum

Cross
Catholicism and Judaism
Christian and Jewish interfaith dialogue
Persecution of Poles
Religious controversies in Poland
Holocaust commemoration
Memorial crosses